Ammuqa (also transliterated 'Amuqa and Amuka) was a Palestinian village, located five kilometres northeast of Safed.

History
Known locally for its seven springs, Ammuqa also enjoyed renown as the site of the sepulchre of Jonathan ben Uzziel. Rabbi Samuel ben Samson, who travelled to Palestine in 1210, writes that the site was marked by "a great tree" where the local Muslim population made vows "to his glory" and gave votive offerings of oil and light.

Ottoman era
In 1517, Ammuqa was incorporated into the Ottoman Empire, and by 1596 tax-records it was under the administration of the nahiyah ("subdistrict") of Jira, part of Safad Sanjak, with a population of 65 households and 6 bachelors; an estimated 391 persons, all Muslim. They paid taxes on wheat, barley, olives,  beehives, vineyards, and goats; a total revenue of 5,585 akçe. 1/12 of the revenue went to a Muslim charitable endowment.

In the second half of the 19th century Algerian followers of Abdelkader El Djezairi have been defeated by the French in Algeria, and sought refuge in another part of the Ottoman Empire. They were given lands in various locations in Ottoman Syria, including Ammuqa, and the close-by Dayshum, Marus, Al-Husayniyya and Tulayl.

British Mandate era
In the 1922 census of Palestine conducted by the British Mandate authorities, 'Amuqa  had a population of 114, all Muslims,  decreasing slightly in the 1931 census to 108, still all  Muslims,  in  a total of 17  houses.

By  the 1944/45 statistics, the village had a population of 140 Muslims with a total land area of 2,574 dunams. Of this, a total of 1,164 dunums of land was used for cereals;  195 dunums were irrigated or used for orchards, while 30 dunams were classified as built-up (or Urban) area.

1948, aftermath
During the 1948 Arab–Israeli War, on the 24 May 1948, Ammuqa was assaulted by the Palmach's First Battalion, headed by Yigal Allon. Following the "systematic" destruction of the villages in the Hula Valley, Ammuqa was evacuated.

In 1980 Amuka was established on village land; about 1 km southeast of the village site.

In 1992 the village site was described: "Nothing remains of the village but the rubble of houses; the site is overgrown with cactuses and eucalyptus, fig, and olive trees. Much of the land around the site is wooded, and some parts are cultivated by the settlement of ‘Ammuqa."

See also
Operation Yiftach
Depopulated Palestinian locations in Israel

References

Bibliography

External links
Welcome to Ammuqa 
'Ammuqa,  Zochrot
Survey of Western Palestine, Map 4: IAA, Wikimedia commons
'Ammuqa,  at Khalil Sakakini Cultural Center
Ammuqa,  Dr. Khalil Rizk.

Arab villages depopulated during the 1948 Arab–Israeli War
District of Safad